The Finland men's national volleyball team is the national volleyball team of Finland. It is governed by the Finland Volleyball Association and takes part in international volleyball competitions. The team's best results to date are fourth place at the European Championships 2007 and ninth place at the 2014 World Championships.
After a one-off appearance in 1993, Finland rejoined the FIVB World League in 2006 and has been part of the competition ever since, making this year’s entry their 12th consecutive. Their best finish to date has been seventh place in 2007.

Results

World Championship

FIVB World League

Nations League

European Championship

European League

Current squad

The following is the Finnish roster in the 2019 Men's European Volleyball Championship

Staff
 Head coach: Joel Banks 
 Assistant coach: Sami Kurttila 
 Assistant coach, physical coach: Andres Esper 
 Team manager: Monika Remmelkoor 
 Scoutman: Panagiotis Kountouridis  
 Masseur/Equipment manager : Pawel Baryla 
 Masseur/Equipment manager: Krzysztof Jakubiak 
 Doctor: Petri Helenius 
 Media manager: Kimmo Nurminen

References

External links
Official website
FIVB profile

National men's volleyball teams
National sports teams of Finland
Volleyball in Finland
Men's sport in Finland